This list comprises all players who have participated in at least one league match for Westchester Flames in the USL since the league began keeping detailed records in 2003. Players who were on the roster but never played a first team game are not listed; players who appeared for the team in other competitions (US Open Cup, etc.) but never actually made an USL appearance are noted at the bottom of the page where appropriate.

A "*" indicates a player known to have appeared for the team prior to 2003.

A
  Andre Akpan
  Kabirou Alassani
  Igor Alvarez
  Charles Altcheck
  Peter Antoniades
  Dimitri Antonopoulos
  Jhonny Arteaga
  Andres Avilas
  Luis Ayala

B
  Sam Bailey
  Dwight Barnett
  David Bartholomew
  Darren Bauer
  Edison Bayas Romero
  Mersim Beskovic
  Ricardo Blanchard
  David Blum
  Shane Boggis
  Scott Bolkan
  Ryan Brown
  Kevin Burns
  Justin Burse

C
  Dario Cabanas
  Christian Camacho
  N'Bandy Camara
  Ricardo Campbell
  Lamar Chancey
  Abraham Chehebar
  Daniel Chica
  Tom Clements
  Jack Cleverley
  Alexander Cunliffe

D
  Charlie Davies
  Kevin Davies
  Thomas Davison
  Raphael de Souza
  Luis Delpezo
  Marcus Teng Deng
  Keith Detelj
  Sasa Dobrijevic
  Nikola Dokic
  Anlindo Dos Santos
  Jose Dos Santos
  Taylor Downs
  Brendan Dunn

E
  Julian Escobar
  Robert Esposito Jr.
  Alcides Esquivel-Garay

F
  Rodrigo Faria*
  Anthony Ferraro
  Justin Flood
  Jon-Paul Francini

G
  Mario Gallo
  Huigens Garcia
  Kevin Gluchowski
  Oliver Gonzalez
  Brandon Guishard

H
  Charles Hakikson
  Charles Hamilton
  Chong Han
  Rich Heredia
  James Hilaire
  Adam Himeno
  Matthew Hoff

I
  Lusi Idarraga

J
  J. J. Jackson
  Julius James
  Sam Jolly

K
  Julian Kapaj
  Ben Kartzman
  David Kinneman
  Michael Konicoff
  Matthew Kontos
  Brian Kuritzky

L
  Jelson Latorre
  Salim Lewis
  Thomas Lobben
  Fernando Londono

M
  Douglas Macias-Rubio
  Laurent Manuel
  Thomas Manz
  Felix Martey
  Diego Martinez
  Richard Martinez
  Ricardo Maxwell-Ordain
  Kevin McPhillips
  Michael McTigue
  Chris Megaloudis
  Kevin Meyer
  Vance Miceli
  Robert Millock
  Christian Moleno
  Matthew Mones
  Alyson Moraes-Zanetti
  Nilton Moreno
  Evan Morgan

N
  Hanse Naounou
  Mauricio Nares-Fragoso
  Dragan Naumoski
  John Niyonsaba
  Javier Nunez

O
  Bryan Oelkers
  William Ogden
  Housainou Ogoo

P
  John Pardini
  Nicholas Patrikis
  Durval Pereira
  David Pinto
  Pablo Pinto
  Laurence Piturro
  Brett Pollack
  Joseph Posillico
  Ezra Prendergast
  Mark Prince

Q
  Brandon Quishard

R
  Shane Recklet
  Kevin Reiman
  Daniel Ribeiro
  Christopher Richards
  Kyle Richards
  Chris Riordan
  Adolfo Rivera
  Omer Rozen
  Vincent Russo
  Andrew Ruth

S
  Luke Sager
  John Sanfilippo
  Moshe Schalchon
  Ricky Schramm
  Michael Semedo
  Anthony Sepe
  Dan Shapiro
  Mark Shkreli
  Thomas Skara
  Nick Smaldone
  Joao Antonio Souza
  John Stamatis
  Huntley Stone

T
  Loukas Tasigianis
  Evoud Thompson
  Kristian Tirri
  Alex Tobon Villa
  Josh Trott

U
  Matthew Uy

V
  David Vasquez
  Julian Vergara
  Athanasios Vlahos-Kitas

W
  Kwame Watson-Siriboe

X
  Emilio Xikis

Y
  Ibrahim Yusuf

Z
  Thierry Zahui

Sources
 
 2010 Westchester Flames stats
 2009 Westchester Flames stats
 2008 Westchester Flames stats
 2007 Westchester Flames stats
 2006 Westchester Flames stats
 2005 Westchester Flames stats

References

Westchester Flames
 
Association football player non-biographical articles